Friedhelm Fischerkeller (3 January 1935 – 28 January 2008) was a German racing cyclist. He rode in the 1961 Tour de France.

References

External links
 

1935 births
2008 deaths
German male cyclists
Place of birth missing
Cyclists from Cologne